The Balkan wars: 1912–13, was a series of articles published by Leon Trotsky in Russian newspaper “Kievskaja mysl” during the Balkan Wars of 1912–1913. In USSR Trotsky's war correspondence was republished as the sixth volume of his collected works under the title “The Balkans and the Balkan War” (1926). English translation of the book appeared in 1980; in 1993, in connection with the Yugoslav wars, it was reissued as an important source on the history of the Balkan Peninsula.

English edition 
  — 524 p.

References

Literature 
 Todorova M. War and Memory: Trotsky’s War Correspondence from the Balkan Wars // Perceptions: Center for Strategic Research (SAM) / Ministry of Foreign Affairs, Turkey. — 2013. — Summer (vol. XVIII, no. 2). — P. 5—27.
 Nelson H. W. Trotsky Reports the Balkan Wars // Leon Trotsky and the Art of Insurrection, 1905–1917. — Psychology Press, 1988. — 158 p. — (Cass series on politics and military affairs in the twentieth century, Vol. 1). — . — .
 Sandner G. Deviationist Perceptions of the Balkan Wars: Leon Trotsky and Otto Neurath // The Balkan Wars from Contemporary Perception to Historic Memory / eds. K. Boeckh, S. Rutar. — Springer, 2016/2017. — 340 p. — . — . — .
 
 Wörsdörfer R. Trotzki und die nationale Frage auf der Balkanhalbinsel (1908–1914) // Archiv für die Geschichte des Widerstandes und der Arbeit / eds. Wolfgang Braunschädel, Johannes Materna. — Fernwald: Germinal Verlag, 1991. — Т. Heft 11. — P. 125—140. — 304 p. — (ISSN 0936-1014). — . [in German]
 Rondholz E. Berichte vom Balkanbrand – der Krieg aus der Sicht dreier Korrespondenten (Leo Trotzki, Otto Kessler und Corrado Zoli) // Die Balkankriege 1912/13 und Griechenland / Choregia; hrsg. Horst-Dieter Blume, Cay Lienau. — Münster: Germinal Verlag, 2014. — Т. Heft 12. — 163 p. — (Münstersche Griechenland-Studien). — . [in German]
 Schwarz P. Einleitung // Die Balkankriege 1912–1913 / Lev Trockij; Hannelore Georgi, Harald Schubärth. — Mehring Verlag, 1996. — 585 p. — . — . [in German]
 Гришина Р. П. Военные корреспонденты Васил Коларов и Лев Троцкий о Балканских войнах 1912–1913 гг // Славяне и Россия: славянские и балканские народы в периодической печати: (сборник статей по материалам научной конференции «Третьи Никитинские чтения», 3 декабря 2013 г., Москва) / Институт славяноведения РАН, С. И. Данченко. — М.: Институт славяноведения РАН, 2014. — С. 288—308. — 419 с. — . [in Russian]
 Нюркаева А. З. Балканы во взглядах Л. Д. Троцкого. — Пермь: Изд-во Перм. ун-та, 1994. — 71, [2] с. —  [in Russian]

1926 non-fiction books
1980 non-fiction books
Works by Leon Trotsky
Russian books